Atal Park (Formerly Central Park) is a public urban park located in the Naya Raipur new capital of Chhattisgarh, India.

Central Park is located on Central Avenue Road on 35 acres of land. It has a 120 seater restaurant, an amphitheatre with a capacity of 1,500 people, mini markets, a yoga park, and an artificial lake built on the south side of the park. In the north, the park has a jogging track, multiplex theatre, restaurant, and playing area for children with 45 swings and an activity centre.

The park represents the rich art and heritage of the state. It was built at a cost of 70 crores by Naya Raipur Development Authority.

References

Naya Raipur
Parks in India
Gardens in India
Memorials to Atal Bihari Vajpayee
Year of birth missing